Lewis Mayo (August 14, 1828 – August 25, 1907) was an American politician, attorney, physician, and businessman.

Early life and education
Mayo was born in Hampden, Maine and attended the Hampden Academy. Mayo then attended Wesleyan University from 1850 to 1852.

Career 
He was admitted to the Minnesota bar in 1862 and practiced law in Sauk Rapids, Minnesota. Mayo was involved in the real estate business, practiced medicine, and was a druggist in Sauk Rapids. Mayo served as probate judge, school superintendent, district court clerk, coroner, and treasurer for Benton County, Minnesota. Mayo served in the Minnesota Senate in 1876 and 1877 and was a Democrat.

Death 
Mayo died in Sauk Rapids, Minnesota.

Notes

External links

1828 births
1907 deaths
People from Hampden, Maine
People from Sauk Rapids, Minnesota
Wesleyan University alumni
American pharmacists
Businesspeople from Minnesota
Physicians from Minnesota
Minnesota lawyers
County officials in Minnesota
Minnesota state court judges
Democratic Party Minnesota state senators
Hampden Academy alumni
19th-century American politicians
19th-century American businesspeople
19th-century American judges